Primera División de México (Mexican First Division) Verano 1998 is a Mexican football tournament - one of two short tournaments that take up the entire year to determine the champion(s) of Mexican football. It began on Saturday, January 3, 1998, and ran until April 6, when the regular season ended. In the final Club Toluca defeated Necaxa and became champions for the 4th time.

Final Standings (groups)

Final Standings (general)

Top scorers

Goals scored throughout the entire tournament including Repechaje, Quarterfinals, Semifinals and Finals.

Playoffs

External links
 Mediotiempo.com (where information was obtained)

Mexico
1997–98 in Mexican football
1998B